Autumn is a feminine given name derived from the Latin word autumnus, meaning "fall" or "autumn".

The name has been in use in the United States since at least the late 1960s and has been ranked among the top 100 names for girls there since 1997. It has also been a popular name for girls in Canada and the United Kingdom in recent years. Historically, the name has been most common in the Northeastern United States and Canada, in regions with many deciduous trees that seasonally change color, which is considered highly attractive. The name has been less common in regions with less distinctive changes during the season.

People named Autumn
 Autumn Bailey (born 1995), Canadian volleyball player
 Autumn Burke (born 1973), American politician
 Autumn Chiklis (born 1993), American actress and writer
 Autumn Christian, American author
 Autumn Daly, houseguest on the second season of Big Brother (US)
 Autumn de Forest (born 2001), American painter
 Autumn de Wilde (born 1970), American photographer
 Autumn Durald (born 1979), American cinematographer
 Autumn Federici, American model, producer, and actress
 Jennifer Blake (wrestler) (born 1983), also known by her ring-name Autumn Frost
 Autumn Hurlbert (born 1980), American singer and actress
 Autumn Jackson (born 1974), American criminal
 Autumn Kent, American mathematician
 Autumn Mills (born 1988), Canadian ice hockey player
 Autumn Peltier (born 2004), Canadian Anishinaabe climate activist
 Autumn Phillips (born 1978), Canadian wife of Peter Phillips, grandson of Queen Elizabeth II
 Autumn Rademacher (born 1975), American women's basketball coach, currently at the University of Detroit Mercy
 Autumn Reeser (born 1980), American actress
 Autumn Rowe (born 1981), American singer and songwriter
 Autumn Sandeen, American transgender activist and blogger
 Autumn Simunek, American beauty pageant titleholder
 Autumn Smithers (born 1997), American professional soccer player
 Autumn-Rain Stephens-Daly, New Zealand professional rugby league footballer

Notes

English feminine given names